The 2011 Bolsover District Council election took place on 5 May 2011 to elect members of Bolsover District Council in Derbyshire, England. The whole council was up for election and the Labour party stayed in overall control of the council.

Election result

Ward results

By-elections between 2011 and 2015

Shirebrook South West
A by-election was held in Shirebrook South West on 25 August 2011 after the death of the independent councillor Alan Waring. The seat was gained for the Labour party by Sandra Peake with a majority of 97 votes over the Green party.

Whitwell

South Normanton East
A by-election was held in South Normanton East on 14 August 2014 after the death of Labour councillor Terry Cook. The seat was held for Labour by Tracey Cannon with a majority of 173 votes over the Conservatives.

Bolsover North West
A by-election was held in Bolsover North West on 8 January 2015 after the death of Labour councillor Thomas Rodda. The seat was held for Labour by Susan Statter with a majority of 21 votes over the UK Independence Party.

References

2011
2011 English local elections
2010s in Derbyshire